The Windsor Village Historic District is a historical district in the center of Windsor, Vermont. It includes several dozen properties which were built in the 18th, the 19th, and in the beginning of the 20th centuries, built in different architectural styles. The district is listed on the National Register of Historic Places since April 23, 1975.

Originally, the district was designated along Main Street, Depot Avenue, and State Street through and including Court Square. Later, Phelps Ct. was added.

History
In 1777, in the Old Constitution House, which is a part of the district, the constitution of the Vermont Republic was drafted. Initially, Windsor was a part-time capital of the Republic, and it remains the seat of Windsor County. This guaranteed an influx of population to the town. Many of newcomers were highly educated professionals. The location of Windsor on the banks of the Connecticut River provided an easy access to transportation routes, and this access was further reinforced by the construction of a railway in 1847. In the 19th century, Windsor was a prosperous industrial and administrative center. This resulted in intensive construction, with industrial-related buildings concentrated on the Main Street and Depot Avenue, including the railway station, and residential buildings located on State Street and in the northern end of Main Street. By the end of the 19th century, the major industrial enterprises in Windsor were producing water pumps, firearms, machine tools, and cotton.

Properties
As of 1975, the list of properties included the properties listed below.  In 1997, three properties on Phelps Court and State Street were added.  It was again enlarged in 2014.

References

Historic districts on the National Register of Historic Places in Vermont
Colonial architecture in Vermont
Victorian architecture in Vermont
Historic districts in Windsor County, Vermont
Windsor, Vermont
National Register of Historic Places in Windsor County, Vermont